The Battle of Krasnokutsk–Gorodnoye took place on February 20–22, 1709 (Gregorian calendar), in the Swedish campaign of Russia during the Great Northern War. The Swedish troops were directly led by Charles XII King of Sweden who persecuted a force of Russians commanded by Karl Evald von Rönne from the minor battle of Krasnokutsk to the town Gorodnoye where a new battle took place. The Swedes were victorious but cancelled their offensive when the night fell.

Prelude 
During the end of the 17th century, Russia, Denmark-Norway, Saxony and Polish–Lithuanian Commonwealth formed an allegiance against the Swedish Empire in order to regain what was lost in earlier wars. However, three of the original four nations were defeated in the span of seven years leaving only Russia to stand up against the Swedish invasions. In 1707 Charles XII began his campaign of Russia and strove through victories as Holowczyn – 1708 and the siege of Veprik – 1708, but also through setbacks as the Swedish defeat at Lesnaya – 1708. Charles reached the outskirts of Krasnokutsk not long after Veprik and there encountered a small force of Russians which he engaged and managed to take several prisoners who told him that Rönne would be close by Krasnokutsk with about 5,000 dragoons. He then began his march there.

Engagement 
He arrived on February 21, with a companion of 2,500 cavalry, many of whom were the elite guards of the Drabant Corps. He quickly engaged the 5,000 Russians under command of Rönne who had taken defensive positions at the end of the small town. Rönne and his force couldn't handle the cavalry shock and almost immediately began to retreat and in disorder they split up in two parts, one ran against a nearby hill and the other one against the nearby river Merla. Charles persecuted the ones heading up the hill and left Colonel Dücker to hunt down those crossing the river.

During the pursuit many Russians were killed in orders from the Swedish king who didn't want to waste any time on captured prisoners during the fast forced chase, but instead catch up with the main bulk of the Russian fleeing army. After a thirteen-hours pursuit they reached Gorodnoye where Rönne made a new stand to repulse the Swedish cavalry. Also with new fresh reinforcements now numbering somewhere between 5,000–10,000. Charles halted his army after discovering this and tried to organize his fairly outspread men.

Rönne then saw an opportunity to strike and launched a huge cavalry assault against the exhausted and numerical disadvantaged Swedish troops. This caused them to rout and run back the way they came. The roles were suddenly reversed and the pre-hunting Swedes were now persecuted by the pre-hunted Russians. Charles and his drabant-companions got separated from the bulk of the army and in personal danger the king fought off the many Russian followers together with his few men.

After some time when the situation was faded to the very critical for the surrounded Swedes, Carl Gustaf Kruse showed up with some new fresh cavalry regiments who charged in and routed the Russians and saved the Swedish king. Rönne pulled his forces away from Gorodnoye and retreated in good order after discovering this. Charles then pulled his troops into Gorodnoye and engaged the remaining Russians but didn't want to chase the ones retreating even further due to the approaching night.

Aftermath 
About 1,500 Russians were either killed or wounded during the engagements, Rönne had pulled his forces back and left the way more open for the Swedish army to march against Moscow. However, the cold weather and the scorched earth tactic the Russians used forced Charles XII plans to waste.

The Swedish casualties were 132 killed and wounded during the engagements, the drabants had suffered 10 dead and many wounded. It's said that Charles showed a lot of personal bravery during the fighting. The campaign however, ended not long after, in 1709 when the Swedish army suffered a crushing defeat in the Battle of Poltava, which ended the time for Sweden as the leading power in the war. Krasnokutsk and Gorodnoye was later burned down by the Swedes, the consequences were fatal, anti-Swedish guerilla warfare began against them.

References

From, Peter: Katastrofen vid Poltava, Historiska media, Lund 2007 (Swedish)
Lanciai, Christian: Segern och nederlaget, 1974 (Swedish)
Nordisk Familjebok (Swedish)
opoccuu (Russian)

Conflicts in 1709
1709 in Europe
Battles of the Great Northern War
Battles involving Russia
Battles involving Sweden
1709 in Russia
Charles XII of Sweden